Deepak Mohoni, is an Indian stock market analyst. It was in 1989 that he coined the term SENSEX.

Biography
Mohoni is a chemical engineering graduate from IIT Kanpur and did his MBA from IIM Calcutta. He studied at the Scindia School Gwalior. He is a regular columnist in The Economic Times and Business World writing about technical analysis. He appears regularly on CNBC-TV18. He has also appeared on BBC, Star TV, Doordarshan, and Reuters TV. His comments on the market are often quoted by Indian financial media.
 He currently heads a consulting firm and runs a website Trendwatch.

References

External links 
 Cats and Dogs : Can you make a killing buying cheap (penny) stocks? an article by Deepak Mohoni

Indian Institute of Management Calcutta alumni
IIT Kanpur alumni
Businesspeople from Mumbai
Living people
Year of birth missing (living people)